Kirby Hall School is a private pre K through 12th grade college preparatory school located in Austin, Texas on the historic grounds of Helen M. Kirby Hall. Dr. and Mrs. Howard F. Rase founded Kirby Hall School in 1976 as a school for academically advanced students.

History 
Kirby Hall was constructed nearby the University of Texas at Austin campus by the Methodist Board of Missions in 1924 as an all-women dormitory. The dormitory remained open until the fall of 1971 and sat empty until it received renovations and updates for the opening of Kirby Hall School in 1976. Kirby Hall School gained recognition by Austin's Historic Landmark Committee as a historic building shortly before opening in 1976.

Notable alumni 

 Will Creedle
 Christopher Pettiet
 Andy Roddick

References

External links
Official Website
Private schools in Texas
Education in Austin, Texas